Great Catherine is a 1968 British comedy film directed by Gordon Flemyng, based on a 1913 one act play by George Bernard Shaw, and starring Peter O'Toole, Zero Mostel, Jeanne Moreau and Jack Hawkins. Like the play, it is loosely based on the story of Sir Charles Hanbury Williams and his time spent as an envoy at the Russian court.

It was shot at Shepperton Studios near London with sets designed by the art directors John Bryan and William Hutchinson. The score was composed by Dimitri Tiomkin.

Synopsis
A British officer, Captain Charles Edstaston, is sent to the Russian court of Catherine the Great as an envoy, where he has to contend with the crafty machinations of her chief minister Potemkin.

Cast
 Peter O'Toole as Charles Edstaston
 Jeanne Moreau as Catherine the Great
 Zero Mostel as Potemkin
 Jack Hawkins as British Ambassador
 Akim Tamiroff as Sergeant
 Marie Lohr as Dowager Lady Gorse
 Kate O'Mara as Varinka
 Angela Scoular as Claire
 Oliver MacGreevy as General Pyskov
 James Mellor as Colonel Pugachov
 Lea Seidl as Grand Duchess
 Claire Gordon as Elizabeth Vokonska
 Declan Mulholland as Count Tokhtamysh
 Janet Kelly as Anna Schuvalova
 Henry Woolf as Egrebyomka

Critical reception
TV Guide wrote, "They waited 55 years to make it (Shaw's play) into a film and would have been well advised to wait another 55 years. What a mishmash!...Mostel, unless held in check, always overacts, and this is a prime example of a stage actor, accustomed to having to play "big" for the people in the last row, overdoing things for the close-up camera"; whereas The New York Times wrote, "GREAT CATHERINE has a great clown named Zero Mostel...the glorious hamming of the portly American makes the picture...Surely Mr. Mostel's antics would have won the playwright's approval...The story, Braced immeasurably by the Shavian lines, as arranged by the scenarist, Hugh Leonard, and stylishly piloted by the director, Gordon Flemyng, the picture is also beautiful in its lavish décor, costumes and color photography."

References

External links
 

1968 films
1960s historical comedy films
British historical comedy films
Films scored by Dimitri Tiomkin
Films based on works by George Bernard Shaw
Films about Catherine the Great
Films directed by Gordon Flemyng
Films set in the Russian Empire
Films shot at Shepperton Studios
Films with screenplays by Hugh Leonard
Warner Bros. films
1960s English-language films
1960s British films